Emile Percival Francis (September 13, 1926 – February 19, 2022), nicknamed "The Cat", was a Canadian ice hockey player, coach, and general manager in the National Hockey League (NHL). He played for the Chicago Black Hawks and New York Rangers from 1946 to 1952. After playing minor league hockey until 1960, he became the Rangers assistant general manager in 1962 and later general manager of the Rangers, St. Louis Blues and Hartford Whalers from 1964 to 1989. Francis led the Rangers to nine consecutive playoffs appearances (1967-75), but could not help deliver a Stanley Cup championship in five decades as a player, coach and executive.

Early life
Francis was born in North Battleford, Saskatchewan, on September 13, 1926. He was raised by his mother, Yvonne Francis, after his father died when he was eight years old. One of his uncles taught him how to play ice hockey. Francis enlisted in the Canadian military when he was 16, and enrolled in non-commissioned officers' school, with the option to attend the Royal Military College of Canada in Kingston, Ontario. However as the Second World War just ended he decided to return to hockey, and went to Moose Jaw, Saskatchewan instead. Francis also played baseball as a youth, and would manage a team in North Battleford. He later recalled he accepted the position as he felt it "would give [him] more experience as far as handling people went, and all that."

Playing career
Francis began his professional career in 1943–44 with the Philadelphia Falcons of the Eastern Hockey League. He later acquired his nickname "the Cat" while playing for the Moose Jaw Canucks of the Saskatchewan Junior Hockey League during the 1945–46 season, when a sportswriter described him as "quick as a cat". During the autumn of 1946, he was given an invitation to participate in the training camp of the Chicago Black Hawks – the sponsor club of the Canucks – held in Regina. In the middle of the 1946–47 season, he was called up to play in the National Hockey League (NHL) for the Black Hawks. He led the league in losses (30) and goals against (183) the following year. He ultimately played 73 games with the franchise over those two seasons. His unique use of a catching mitt based upon the design of a baseball first baseman's glove drew the attention of league officials. Francis argued that the popular gloves of the time put too much strain on the hand of goalkeepers, and, after gaining executive approval, equipment based on Francis's glove became commonplace.

In October 1948, Francis was traded with Alex Kaleta to the New York Rangers in exchange for Jim Henry. Over the next four years, he would play sparingly in a relief role for the Rangers, while playing mostly on New York's American Hockey League affiliate. He finished his career in the Western Hockey League, including stints with the Vancouver Canucks, Saskatoon Quakers, and Seattle Americans. Francis retired from playing at the conclusion of the 1959–60 season.

Coaching and executive career
Upon retirement in 1960, Francis initially was asked to coach in Moose Jaw, but without a firm agreement in place he declined the offer. Sought after for his leadership skills, he instead joined the Rangers organization; offered a choice to coach their senior affiliate in Trois Rivieres, Quebec or junior team in Guelph, Ontario, he chose Guelph and became the coach of the Ontario Hockey Association's Guelph Royals. Two years later, he was summoned to the Rangers and became assistant general manager, and in 1964, he took over as general manager, and then a year later assumed the coaching position as well. Although he coached a struggling team during his first season, Francis would remain behind the bench for ten seasons (except for brief moves to a solely front office position in 1968 and 1973), making the playoffs in each year and leading his team to a loss in the 1972 Stanley Cup Finals. However, his decision on October 31, 1975, to release Eddie Giacomin – who was popular with Rangers fans – drew their ire. When Giacomin returned to Madison Square Garden two days later as a Detroit Red Wings player, some fans chanted "Kill the Cat".

After being fired by the Rangers in January 1976, Francis joined the St. Louis Blues as general manager and executive vice president, and accepted a 10% ownership stake in the team. When NHL president Clarence Campbell announced he would retire in the mid-1970s, Francis was touted as a potential successor (John Ziegler ultimately replaced Campbell in 1977). He was instrumental in finding a local owner for the financially troubled franchise in the early 1980s, and he also returned to the bench for two separate head coaching stints. In 1983 Francis took a position with the Hartford Whalers, serving as general manager until 1988 and team president from 1988 until 1993.

Later life
In retirement, Francis supported junior hockey in the New York and St. Louis markets. He was inducted into the Hockey Hall of Fame in 1982 under the builders category. He was conferred the Lester Patrick Trophy that same year, in recognition of his contributions to hockey in the United States. He later received the Wayne Gretzky International Award in 2015.

Personal life
Francis met his wife Emma while in Saskatchewan, where she was studying to become a nurse. They were married for 68 years, until her death in 2020. Together, they had two sons: Bobby and Rick. Bobby was head coach of the Phoenix Coyotes and won the Jack Adams Award in 2002. Rick was the vice president of marketing and sales for the Whalers. In September 2007, Emma was reported missing after dropping Emile off at the Palm Beach International Airport for a flight to New Jersey. Neighbors reported not seeing Emma return home after driving to the airport. She was later found safe in a local hotel several days later.

Francis died on February 19, 2022, at the age of 95.

Career statistics

Regular season and playoffs

Source: Total Hockey

Coaching record

Source: Total Hockey

See also
List of members of the Hockey Hall of Fame
Notable families in the NHL

References

Bibliography

External links
 

1926 births
2022 deaths
Canadian ice hockey coaches
Canadian ice hockey goaltenders
Chicago Blackhawks players
Cincinnati Mohawks (AHL) players
Cleveland Barons (1937–1973) players
Hartford Whalers executives
Hockey Hall of Fame inductees
Ice hockey people from Saskatchewan
Kansas City Pla-Mors players
Lester Patrick Trophy recipients
Moose Jaw Canucks players
New Haven Ramblers players
New York Rangers coaches
New York Rangers executives
New York Rangers general managers
New York Rangers players
Philadelphia Falcons players
Regina Capitals players
Saskatoon Quakers players
Seattle Totems (WHL) players
Spokane Comets players
Spokane Spokes players
Sportspeople from North Battleford
St. Louis Blues coaches
St. Louis Blues executives
Vancouver Canucks (WHL) players
Washington Lions players